The Albany Great Danes women's basketball team is the basketball team that represents the University at Albany, State University of New York in Albany, New York. The school's team currently competes in the America East Conference and plays its home games at SEFCU Arena.

History
UAlbany Women's Basketball had little success on the court since it started play in 1964–65. Its greatest success took place in 1985–86 when it went 26–4 and made it the 3rd Round of the NCAA Division III Tournament. Coach Mari Warner would lead the program into Division I play in 1999–00, but again success was limited. Through the 2000s under new coach Trina Patterson, winning was also limited. However, things began to change in 2010–11 under former head coach Katie Abrahamson-Henderson. That season UA finished over .500 for the first time since 1997–98. Abrahamson-Henderson led UAlbany to its then-best record in Division I history in the 2011–12, going 23–10 overall. The Great Danes brought home their first-ever America East Conference title, and represented the league in the NCAA Tournament. UAlbany visited defending National Champions Texas A&M, but fell 69–47.

The Great Danes dominated all conference opposition in the 2012–13 season with a 27–4 overall record, winning all games against America East opponents including 16 regular season games and all league championship contests. UAlbany became the first team to go undefeated in the America East and win the conference since the 1995–96 season. Abrahamson-Henderson earned America East Coach of the Year honors for her efforts. Ebone Henry was named the America East Co-Player of the Year and Defensive Player of the Year. They would win their second straight title, but lose to North Carolina 59–54 in the first round.

The 2013–14 Great Danes did not lose a beat, earning a three-peat as America East champion, going 28–5 with a 15–1 conference record. The team earned the 1-seed in the America East Tournament after winning its first 15 league games. It would win its 3rd straight and earned a 15-seed in the NCAAs and pushed 2-seed West Virginia to the brink before falling 76–61 in the NCAA First Round.

In 2014–15 UA went 24–9 overall with a 14–2 America East record. UAlbany had a number of program firsts that season, including the first win over a Power Five program, defeating three-time reigning Big Ten regular season champion Penn State to earn a berth into the Preseason WNIT semi-finals, the first DI All-American with Shereesha Richards and the program's highest-ever NCAA seeding at 13, battling Duke to the end and leading in the final minute, falling to the Blue Devils 54–52.

On March 11, 2016, the Great Danes would win their conference record breaking 5th straight title. They would defeat Maine 59–58, who they shared the co-regular season title with back-to-back years. Both teams split their regular season match-up.

Two players that would have their numbers retired once their time was over at UAlbany was Ebone Henry and Julie Foster. In 2012–13 Henry was named the America East Co-Player of the Year and Defensive Player of the Year with 13.8 points, 5.1 rebounds and 2.8 steals per game. She would also win three straight Defensive Player of the Year awards and three First Team All-Conference.

Shereesha Richards was also critical in the 5 straight titles for UAlbany. She would win three America East Player of the Year awards along with a Co-Rookie of the Year Award. She would finish as the All-Time scorer in UAlbany Basketball history (Men's and Women's program) with 2,440 points and became the first DI All-American in Great Danes history. She would finish her career with over 2,000 points and 1,000 rebounds.

Sources:

 Albany Media Guide
 America East Media
America East standings

|-style="background: #ffffdd;"
| colspan="8" align="center" | NCAA Division III

|-style="background: #ffffdd;"
| colspan="8" align="center" | NCAA Division II

|-style="background: #ffffdd;"
| colspan="8" align="center" | NCAA Division I

|-style="background: #ffffdd;"
| colspan="8" align="center" | America East Conference

Postseason

NCAA Division I
The Great Danes have appeared in the NCAA Division I Tournament six times. Their combined record is 1–6.

NCAA Division III
The Great Danes appeared in the NCAA Division III Tournament two times, with a combined record of 3–2.

References

External links